The 1955 Delaware State Hornets football team represented Delaware State College—now known as Delaware State University—as a member of the Central Intercollegiate Athletic Association (CIAA) in the 1955 college football season. Led by coach Edward Jackson in his seventh and final season, the Hornets compiled a 7–1 record for the second consecutive year, ranking 12th nationally. The team's only lost was by a field goal, against undefeated Maryland State. There were 3,500 fans in attendance, a record for Delaware State.

Schedule

References

Delaware State
Delaware State Hornets football seasons
Delaware State Hornets football